Ema Masi is a Fijian rugby union player.

In 2013, Masi was selected for the Australian women's extended training squad in preparation for the 2014 Youth Olympic Games in China. She was one of 22 Olympic hopefuls that attended a series of training camps in Narrabeen in hopes of making the final squad.

In 2017, she played for the University of Canberra in the Australian University Sevens competition.

Masi played for the Brumbies Women in the 2020 Super W season, she scored a brace of tries in the 24–12 loss to Queensland. She was named the 2020 Super W Player of the year.

In 2022, she was named in the Queensland Reds wider training squad for Super W.

Masi was selected for the Fijiana squad for two test matches against Australia and Japan in May. She made her international debut in the test against Australia. In July, she was recalled into the Fijiana squad for the 2022 Oceania Championship in New Zealand. She was in the starting line up for the test against Papua New Guinea. She then featured in the match against Tonga.

References 

Year of birth missing (living people)
Living people
Female rugby union players
Fiji women's international rugby union players